The Himalayan black-lored tit (Machlolophus xanthogenys), also known as simply black-lored tit, is a passerine bird in the tit family Paridae. The yellow-cheeked tit is probably its closest relative, and it may also be related to the yellow tit. These three tits almost certainly form a distinct lineage, as indicated by morphology, and mtDNA cytochrome b sequence analysis (Gill et al., 2005).

Lore in the bird's common name refers to the area between eye and bill.

This species is a resident breeder along the Himalayas in the Indian Subcontinent including Nepal.In Nepali, it is known as "Pandu Chichilkote".

It is an active and agile feeder, taking insects and spiders from the forest canopy, and sometimes fruit.

It uses woodpecker or barbet holes for nesting, and will also excavate its own hole or use man-made sites.

The Himalayan black-lored tit was formerly one of the many species in the genus Parus but was moved to Machlolophus after a molecular phylogenetic analysis published in 2013 showed that the members of the new genus formed a distinct clade.

References 

Gill, Frank B.; Slikas, Beth & Sheldon, Frederick H. (2005): Phylogeny of titmice (Paridae): II. Species relationships based on sequences of the mitochondrial cytochrome-b gene. Auk 122: 121–143. DOI: 10.1642/0004-8038(2005)122[0121:POTPIS]2.0.CO;2 HTML abstract
Grimmett, Richard; Inskipp, Carol, Inskipp, Tim & Byers, Clive (1999): Birds of India, Pakistan, Nepal, Bangladesh, Bhutan, Sri Lanka, and the Maldives. Princeton University Press, Princeton, N.J.. 
Harrap, Simon & Quinn, David (1996): Tits, Nuthatches & Treecreepers. Christopher Helm, London. 
Rasmussen, P.C., and J.C. Anderton. 2005. Birds of South Asia. The Ripley guide. Volume 2: attributes and status. Smithsonian Institution and Lynx Edicions, Washington D.C. and Barcelona.

Himalayan black-lored tit
Birds of the Himalayas
Himalayan black-lored tit
Taxa named by Nicholas Aylward Vigors